Nitin Kumar (born 14 November 1985) is an Indian professional darts player, who competed in Professional Darts Corporation events.

Darts career
In 2011, he represented Team India at the 2011 WDF World Cup along with Amit Gilitwala, Sarthak Patel, Chandrika Singh & Phalgun Tiruvasu.

In 2014, he represented India at the 2014 PDC World Cup of Darts along with Amit Gilitwala, where they lost 5–0 in the first round to the Belgium pair of Kim Huybrechts and Ronny Huybrechts.

In 2015, he represented India at the 2015 PDC World Cup of Darts along with Ashfaque Sayed, where they lost 5–0 in the first round to the German pair of Jyhan Artut and Max Hopp.

In 2018, he won the Indian Qualifier for the 2019 PDC World Darts Championship, beating Ankit Goenka 5-0 in the final. In his First Round match with Jeffrey de Zwaan he could win three legs before losing 3-0. In 2019, he won the Indian Qualifier for the 2020 PDC World Darts Championship, beating Ravi Bhat 6-1 in the final. In 2021, he won the Indian Qualifier for the 2022 PDC World Darts Championship, beating Vikehelie Suohu 6-0 in the final to secure a third appearance in four years.

World Championship results

PDC
 2019: First round (lost to Jeffrey de Zwaan 0–3) 
 2020: First round (lost to Brendan Dolan 0–3)
 2022: First round (lost to Ricky Evans 0–3)

Performance timeline
PDC

References

External links
www.trbdarts.in - Player Website

1985 births
Living people
Indian darts players
Professional Darts Corporation associate players
PDC World Cup of Darts Indian team
Sportspeople from Tamil Nadu